The Wolf (French: La louve) is a 1949 French drama film directed by Guillaume Radot and starring Claude Génia, Jean Davy and Renaud Mary. The film's sets were designed by the art director Marcel Magniez.

Cast
 Claude Génia as Henriette  
 Jean Davy as Saint-Ricquier  
 Renaud Mary as Rémi  
 Héléna Bossis as Marie 
 Michel Barbey as Le frère de Marie  
 Georges Bever as Signol  
 Yves Brainville as Le docteur Maillet  
 Jean Carmet as Gustave  
 Jacky Flynt as Pulchérie  
 Héléna Manson as Alphonsine  
 Maya as Madame Bontemps  
 Palau as Dermont

References

Bibliography 
 Christian Gilles. Le cinéma des années quarante par ceux qui l'ont fait. Harmattan, 2000.

External links 
 

1949 films
1940s French-language films
Films directed by Guillaume Radot
French thriller drama films
1940s thriller drama films
French black-and-white films
1949 drama films
1940s French films